The 110th United States Congress was a meeting of the legislative branch of the United States federal government, between January 3, 2007, and January 3, 2009, during the last two years of the Presidency of George W. Bush. It was composed of the Senate and the House of Representatives. The apportionment of seats in the House was based on the 2000 U.S. census.

The Democratic Party won a majority in both chambers, giving them full control of Congress for the first time since the 103rd Congress in 1993, which was also the previous time they controlled the House.

Officially in the Senate, there were 49 Democrats, 49 Republicans, and two independents, but because both of the independents caucused with the Democrats, this gave the Democrats an operational majority. No Democratic-held seats had fallen to the Republican Party in the 2006 elections.

This is the most recent Congress to feature Republican senators from Minnesota (Norm Coleman), New Mexico (Pete Domenici) and Oregon (Gordon Smith), in which Domenici retired and the other two lost re-election at the end of the Congress.

Democrat Nancy Pelosi became the first female speaker of the House. The House also received the first Muslim (Keith Ellison) and Buddhist (Hank Johnson and Mazie Hirono) members of Congress.

Major events
Members debated initiatives such as the Democrats' 100-Hour Plan and the Iraq War troop surge of 2007.

Support for the Iraq War
Following President Bush's 2007 State of the Union Address, Congress debated his proposal to create a troop surge to increase security in Iraq. The House of Representatives passed a non-binding measure opposing the surge and then a $124 billion emergency spending measure to fund the war, which included language that dictated troop levels and withdrawal schedules. President Bush, however, vetoed the bill as promised, making this his second veto while in office.  Both houses of Congress subsequently passed a bill funding the war without timelines, but with benchmarks for the Iraqi government and money for other spending projects like disaster relief.

Other events

 January 23, 2007: President Bush delivered the 2007 State of the Union Address
 August 2, 2007: The Republican minority disputed the results of a vote to recommit. This led to an investigation by the House Select Committee on Voting Irregularities.
 December 18, 2007: The Senate set a record for the most cloture votes.
 January 2008: Start of the Great Recession
 January 28, 2008: President Bush delivered the 2008 State of the Union Address
 September 15, 2008: The precipitation of global financial crisis intensifies a recession that began in January.
 November 4, 2008: General elections - Democrats increased their congressional majorities and Senator Barack Obama was elected president.

Major legislation

{| class="toc"
|-
| Contents: Enacted  Pending or failed  Vetoed|}
These are partial lists of prominent enacted legislation and pending bills.

Enacted

 February 2, 2007 — House Page Board Revision Act of 2007, 
 May 25, 2007 — U.S. Troop Readiness, Veterans' Care, Katrina Recovery, and Iraq Accountability Appropriations Act, 2007, including Title VIII: Fair Minimum Wage Act of 2007, 
 June 14, 2007 — Preserving United States Attorney Independence Act of 2007, 
 July 26, 2007 — Foreign Investment and National Security Act of 2007, 
 August 3, 2007 — Implementing Recommendations of the 9/11 Commission Act of 2007, 
 August 5, 2007 — Protect America Act of 2007, 
 August 9, 2007 --- America COMPETES Act, Pub.L. 110-69
 September 14, 2007 — Honest Leadership and Open Government Act, 
 September 20, 2007 --- Native American $1 Coin Act, Pub.L. 110-82
 September 27, 2007 --- Food and Drug Administration Amendments Act of 2007, Pub.L. 110-85
 November 8, 2007 — Water Resources Development Act of 2007,  (Veto overridden)
 December 19, 2007 — Energy Independence and Security Act of 2007, 
 December 20, 2007 --- Mortgage Forgiveness Debt Relief Act of 2007, Pub.L. 110-142
 December 31, 2007 --- OPEN Government Act of 2007, Pub.L. 110-175
 January 28, 2008 --- National Defense Authorization Act for Fiscal Year 2008, Pub.L. 110-181
 February 13, 2008 — Economic Stimulus Act of 2008, 
 April 9, 2008 --- Second Chance Act of 2007, Pub.L. 110-199
 April 24, 2008 --- Newborn Screening Saves Lives Act of 2007, Pub.L. 110-204
 May 8, 2008 --- Consolidated Natural Resources Act of 2008, Pub.L. 110-229
 May 21, 2008 — Genetic Information Nondiscrimination Act, 
 May 22, 2008 — Food and Energy Security Act of 2007 (2007 Farm Bill),  (Veto overridden)
 June 18, 2008 --- Food, Conservation, and Energy Act of 2008, Pub.L. 110-246 (Veto overridden)
 June 20, 2008 --- Federal Food Donation Act of 2008, Pub.L. 110-247
 June 30, 2008 — Supplemental Appropriations Act of 2008, including Title V: Post-9/11 Veterans Educational Assistance Act of 2008 ("G.I. Bill 2008")
 July 10, 2008 — FISA Amendments Act of 2008, 
 July 15, 2008 --- Medicare Improvements for Patients and Providers Act of 2008, Pub.L. 110-275 (Veto overridden)
 July 29, 2008 — Tom Lantos Block Burmese JADE (Junta's Anti-Democratic Efforts) Act of 2008, 
 July 29, 2008 --- Clean Boating Act of 2008, Pub.L. 110-288
 July 30, 2008 — Housing and Economic Recovery Act of 2008, 
 August 14, 2008 --- Consumer Product Safety Improvement Act, Pub.L. 110-314
 September 25, 2008 --- ADA Amendments Act of 2008, Pub.L. 110-325

 October 3, 2008 — Public Law 110-343, including:
 Div. A: Emergency Economic Stabilization Act of 2008, ;
 Div. B: Energy Improvement and Extension Act of 2008; and
 Div. C: Tax Extenders and Alternative Minimum Tax Relief Act of 2008
October 7, 2008 --- Fostering Connections to Success and Increasing Adoptions Act of 2008, Pub.L. 110-351
 October 8. 2008 --- India-United States Civil Nuclear Agreement, Pub.L. 110-369
 October 13, 2008 --- PRO-IP Act, Pub.L. 110-403
 October 13, 2008 --- Drug Trafficking Vessel Interdiction Act of 2008, Pub.L. 110-407
 October 15, 2008 — : Setting the beginning of the first session of the 111th Congress and the date for counting Electoral College votes, 
 October 16, 2008 --- Passenger Rail Investment and Improvement Act of 2008, Pub.L. 110-432
 December 2, 2008 --- Civil Rights Act of 1964 Commemorative Coin Act, Pub.L. 110-451
 December 19, 2008 — : A Saxbe fix, reducing the compensation and other emoluments attached to the office of Secretary of State to that which was in effect on January 1, 2007: allowing Hillary Clinton to serve as Secretary of State despite the Ineligibility Clause of the United States Constitution.
 December 23, 2008 --- America's Beautiful National Parks Quarter Dollar Coin Act of 2008, Pub.L. 110-456
 December 23, 2008 --- Short-term Analog Flash and Emergency Readiness Act, Pub.L. 110-459

More information: Public Laws for the 110th Congress  and Complete index of Public and Private Laws for 110th Congress at GPO

 Proposed, but not enacted 
:in (alphabetical order) America's Climate Security Act of 2007
 Auto Industry Financing and Restructuring Act
 Comprehensive Immigration Reform Act of 2007
 Deceptive Practices and Voter Intimidation Prevention Act
 District of Columbia House Voting Rights Act of 2007
 Employee Free Choice Act
 Employment Non-Discrimination Act
 Executive Branch Reform Act of 2007
 Family and Consumer Choice Act of 2007
 Global Warming Pollution Reduction Act of 2007
 Habeas Corpus Restoration Act of 2007
 Iraq War De-Escalation Act of 2007
 Local Law Enforcement Hate Crimes Prevention Act of 2007
 Medicare Prescription Drug Price Negotiation Act of 2007
 Personal Use of Marijuana by Responsible Adults Act of 2008
 Public Safety Employer-Employee Cooperation Act of 2007
 State Children's Health Insurance Program

Vetoed
 Children's Health Insurance Program Reauthorization Act of 2007 (SCHIP)
 Children's Health Insurance Program Reauthorization Act of 2007 (SCHIP)
 Departments of Labor, Health and Human Services, and Education, and Related Agencies Appropriations Act
 Stem Cell Research Enhancement Act of 2007
 Intelligence Authorization Act for Fiscal Year 2008

 : an earlier version of National Defense Authorization Act for Fiscal Year 2008
 : an earlier version of U.S. Troop Readiness, Veterans' Care, Katrina Recovery, and Iraq Accountability Appropriations Act, 2007

 Treaties ratified 
 110-1: Land-Based Sources Protocol to Cartagena Convention (September 25, 2008)
 110-2: Singapore Treaty on the Law of Trademarks (December 7, 2007)
 110-3: Tax Convention with Belgium (December 14, 2007)
 110-4: International Convention for the Suppression of Acts of Nuclear Terrorism (September 25, 2008)
 110-6: Amendment to Convention on Physical Protection of Nuclear Material (September 25, 2008)
 110-8: Protocols of 2005 to the Convention concerning Safety of Maritime Navigation and to the Protocol concerning Safety of Fixed Platforms on the Continental Shelf (September 25, 2008)
 110-9: Protocol of Amendments to Convention on International Hydrographic Organization (July 21, 2008)
 110-11: Extradition Treaty with Romania and Protocol to the Treaty on Mutual Legal Assistance in Criminal Matters with Romania (September 23, 2008)
 110-12: Extradition Treaty with Bulgaria and an Agreement on Certain Aspects of Mutual Legal Assistance in Criminal Matters with Bulgaria (September 23, 2008)
 110-13: International Convention on Control of Harmful Anti-Fouling Systems on Ships, 2001 (September 26, 2008)
 110-14: International Convention Against Doping in Sport (July 21, 2008)
 110-15: Protocol Amending 1980 Tax Convention with Canada (September 23, 2008)
 110-16: Amendments to the Constitution and Convention of the International Telecommunication Union (Geneva, 1992) (September 25, 2008)
 110-17: Tax Convention with Iceland (September 23, 2008)
 110-18: Tax Convention with Bulgaria with Proposed Protocol of Amendment (September 23, 2008)
 110-20: Protocols to the North Atlantic Treaty of 1949 on Accession of Albania and Croatia (September 25, 2008)

Select committees

 Joint Committee on Inaugural Ceremonies
 House Select Committee on Energy Independence and Global Warming
 House Select Committee on the Voting Irregularities of August 2, 2007

Hearings

 Dismissal of U.S. attorneys controversy hearings - (House and Senate Judiciary Committees)

Party summary

Senate

Membership changed with one death and two resignations.

House of Representatives

Membership fluctuated with seven deaths and eight resignations. Democrats achieved a net gain of three seats as a result of their victories in special elections. See Changes in membership, below.Leadership

Senate

 President: Dick Cheney (R)
 President pro tempore: Robert Byrd (D)

Majority (Democratic) leadership
 Majority Leader and Democratic Conference Chairman: Harry Reid
 Assistant Majority Leader (Majority Whip): Dick Durbin
 Democratic Conference Vice Chairman and Democratic Campaign Committee Chairman: Chuck Schumer
 Democratic Conference Secretary: Patty Murray
 Policy Committee Chairman: Byron Dorgan
 Steering and Outreach Committee Chairwoman: Debbie Stabenow
 Committee Outreach Chairman: Jeff Bingaman
 Committee Outreach Vice Chairwoman: Hillary Clinton
 Rural Outreach Chairwoman: Blanche Lincoln
 Chief Deputy Whip: Barbara Boxer
 Deputy Whips: Tom Carper, Bill Nelson, Russ Feingold

Minority (Republican) leadership
 Minority Leader: Mitch McConnell
 Assistant Minority Leader (Minority Whip): Trent Lott, until December 18, 2007
 Jon Kyl, from December 18, 2007
 Counselor to the Minority Leader: Bob Bennett
 Republican Conference Chairman: Jon Kyl, until December 18, 2007
 Lamar Alexander, from December 18, 2007
 Policy Committee Chairman: Kay Bailey Hutchison
 Republican Conference Vice Chairman: John Cornyn
 National Republican Senatorial Committee Chairman: John Ensign
Chief Deputy Whip: John Thune

House of Representatives

 Speaker: Nancy Pelosi (D)
 Assistant to the Speaker: Xavier Becerra

Majority (Democratic) leadership
 Majority Leader: Steny Hoyer
 Majority Whip: Jim Clyburn
 Senior Chief Deputy Majority Whip: John Lewis
 Chief Deputy Majority Whips: Debbie Wasserman Schultz, G. K. Butterfield, Joseph Crowley, Diana DeGette, Ed Pastor, Jan Schakowsky, John S. Tanner, and Maxine Waters
 Democratic Caucus Chairman: Rahm Emanuel
 Democratic Caucus Vice-Chairman: John Larson
 Democratic Campaign Committee Chairman: Chris Van Hollen
 Democratic Steering/Policy Committee Co-Chairs: Rosa DeLauro for Steering and George Miller for Policy

Minority (Republican) leadership
 Minority Leader: John Boehner
 Minority Whip: Roy Blunt
 Chief Deputy Minority Whip: Eric Cantor
 Republican Conference Chairman: Adam Putnam
 Republican Policy Committee Chairman: Thad McCotter
 Republican Conference Vice-Chair: Kay Granger
 Republican Conference Secretary: John Carter
 Republican Campaign Committee Chairman: Tom Cole
Ranking Member of the House Rules Committee: David Dreier

Members
 Skip to House of Representatives, belowSenate
Senators are listed by state, then by class, In this Congress, Class 2 meant their term ended with this Congress, requiring reelection in 2008; Class 3 meant their term began in the last Congress, requiring reelection in 2010; and Class 1 meant their term began in this Congress, requiring reelection in 2012.

Alabama
 2. Jeff Sessions (R)
 3. Richard Shelby (R)

Alaska
 2. Ted Stevens (R)
 3. Lisa Murkowski (R)

Arizona
 1. Jon Kyl (R)
 3. John McCain (R)

Arkansas
 2. Mark Pryor (D)
 3. Blanche Lincoln (D)

California
 1. Dianne Feinstein (D)
 3. Barbara Boxer (D)

Colorado
 2. Wayne Allard (R)
 3. Ken Salazar (D)

Connecticut
 1. Joe Lieberman (ID)
 3. Chris Dodd (D)

Delaware
 1. Tom Carper (D)
 2. Joe Biden (D)

Florida
 1. Bill Nelson (D)
 3. Mel Martinez (R)

Georgia
 2. Saxby Chambliss (R)
 3. Johnny Isakson (R)

Hawaii
 1. Daniel Akaka (D)
 3. Daniel Inouye (D)

Idaho
 2. Larry Craig (R)
 3. Mike Crapo (R)

Illinois
 2. Dick Durbin (D)
 3. Barack Obama (D), until November 16, 2008, vacant thereafter

Indiana
 1. Richard Lugar (R)
 3. Evan Bayh (D)

Iowa
 2. Tom Harkin (D)
 3. Chuck Grassley (R)

Kansas
 2. Pat Roberts (R)
 3. Sam Brownback (R)

Kentucky
 2. Mitch McConnell (R)
 3. Jim Bunning (R)

Louisiana
 2. Mary Landrieu (D)
 3. David Vitter (R)

Maine
 1. Olympia Snowe (R)
 2. Susan Collins (R)

Maryland
 1. Ben Cardin (D)
 3. Barbara Mikulski (D)

Massachusetts
 1. Ted Kennedy (D)
 2. John Kerry (D)

Michigan
 1. Debbie Stabenow (D)
 2. Carl Levin (D)

Minnesota
 1. Amy Klobuchar (DFL)
 2. Norm Coleman (R)

Mississippi
 1. Trent Lott (R), until December 18, 2007
 Roger Wicker (R), from December 31, 2007
 2. Thad Cochran (R)

Missouri
 1. Claire McCaskill (D)
 3. Kit Bond (R)

Montana
 1. Jon Tester (D)
 2. Max Baucus (D)

Nebraska
 1. Ben Nelson (D)
 2. Chuck Hagel (R)

Nevada
 1. John Ensign (R)
 3. Harry Reid (D)

New Hampshire
 2. John E. Sununu (R)
 3. Judd Gregg (R)

New Jersey
 1. Bob Menendez (D)
 2. Frank Lautenberg (D)

New Mexico
 1. Jeff Bingaman (D)
 2. Pete Domenici (R)

New York
 1. Hillary Clinton (D)
 3. Chuck Schumer (D)

North Carolina
 2. Elizabeth Dole (R)
 3. Richard Burr (R)

North Dakota
 1. Kent Conrad (D-NPL)
 3. Byron Dorgan (D-NPL)

Ohio
 1. Sherrod Brown (D)
 3. George Voinovich (R)

Oklahoma
 2. Jim Inhofe (R)
 3. Tom Coburn (R)

Oregon
 2. Gordon H. Smith (R)
 3. Ron Wyden (D)

Pennsylvania
 1. Bob Casey Jr. (D)
 3. Arlen Specter (R)

Rhode Island
 1. Sheldon Whitehouse (D)
 2. Jack Reed (D)

South Carolina
 2. Lindsey Graham (R)
 3. Jim DeMint (R)

South Dakota
 2. Tim Johnson (D)
 3. John Thune (R)

Tennessee
 1. Bob Corker (R)
 2. Lamar Alexander (R)

Texas
 1. Kay Bailey Hutchison (R)
 2. John Cornyn (R)

Utah
 1. Orrin Hatch (R)
 3. Bob Bennett (R)

Vermont
 1. Bernie Sanders (I)
 3. Patrick Leahy (D)

Virginia
 1. Jim Webb (D)
 2. John Warner (R)

Washington
 1. Maria Cantwell (D)
 3. Patty Murray (D)

West Virginia
 1. Robert Byrd (D)
 2. Jay Rockefeller (D)

Wisconsin
 1. Herb Kohl (D)
 3. Russ Feingold (D)

Wyoming
 1. Craig Thomas (R), until June 4, 2007
 John Barrasso (R), from June 22, 2007
 2. Mike Enzi (R)

House of Representatives

Alabama
 . Jo Bonner (R)
 . Terry Everett (R)
 . Mike D. Rogers (R)
 . Robert Aderholt (R)
 . Bud Cramer (D)
 . Spencer Bachus (R)
 . Artur Davis (D)

Alaska
 . Don Young (R)

Arizona
 . Rick Renzi (R)
 . Trent Franks (R)
 . John Shadegg (R)
 . Ed Pastor (D)
 . Harry Mitchell (D)
 . Jeff Flake (R)
 . Raúl Grijalva (D)
 . Gabby Giffords (D)

Arkansas
 . Robert Marion Berry (D)
 . Vic Snyder (D)
 . John Boozman (R)
 . Mike Ross (D)

California
 . Mike Thompson (D)
 . Wally Herger (R)
 . Dan Lungren (R)
 . John Doolittle (R)
 . Doris Matsui (D)
 . Lynn Woolsey (D)
 . George Miller (D)
 . Nancy Pelosi (D)
 . Barbara Lee (D)
 . Ellen Tauscher (D)
 . Jerry McNerney (D)
 . Tom Lantos (D), until February 11, 2008
 Jackie Speier (D), from April 8, 2008
 . Pete Stark (D)
 . Anna Eshoo (D)
 . Mike Honda (D)
 . Zoe Lofgren (D)
 . Sam Farr (D)
 . Dennis Cardoza (D)
 . George Radanovich (R)
 . Jim Costa (D)
 . Devin Nunes (R)
 . Kevin McCarthy (R)
 . Lois Capps (D)
 . Elton Gallegly (R)
 . Howard McKeon (R)
 . David Dreier (R)
 . Brad Sherman (D)
 . Howard Berman (D)
 . Adam Schiff (D)
 . Henry Waxman (D)
 . Xavier Becerra (D)
 . Hilda Solis (D)
 . Diane Watson (D)
 . Lucille Roybal-Allard (D)
 . Maxine Waters (D)
 . Jane Harman (D)
 . Juanita Millender-McDonald (D), until April 22, 2007
 Laura Richardson (D), from August 21, 2007
 . Grace Napolitano (D)
 . Linda Sánchez (D)
 . Ed Royce (R)
 . Jerry Lewis (R)
 . Gary Miller (R)
 . Joe Baca (D)
 . Ken Calvert (R)
 . Mary Bono (R)
 . Dana Rohrabacher (R)
 . Loretta Sanchez (D)
 . John Campbell (R)
 . Darrell Issa (R)
 . Brian Bilbray (R)
 . Bob Filner (D)
 . Duncan L. Hunter (R)
 . Susan Davis (D)

Colorado
 . Diana DeGette (D)
 . Mark Udall (D)
 . John Salazar (D)
 . Marilyn Musgrave (R)
 . Doug Lamborn (R)
 . Tom Tancredo (R)
 . Ed Perlmutter (D)

Connecticut
 . John Larson (D)
 . Joe Courtney (D)
 . Rosa DeLauro (D)
 . Chris Shays (R)
 . Chris Murphy (D)

Delaware
 . Mike Castle (R)

Florida
 . Jeff Miller (R)
 . Allen Boyd (D)
 . Corrine Brown (D)
 . Ander Crenshaw (R)
 . Ginny Brown-Waite (R)
 . Cliff Stearns (R)
 . John Mica (R)
 . Ric Keller (R)
 . Gus Bilirakis (R)
 . Bill Young (R)
 . Kathy Castor (D)
 . Adam Putnam (R)
 . Vern Buchanan (R)
 . Connie Mack IV (R)
 . Dave Weldon (R)
 . Tim Mahoney (D)
 . Kendrick Meek (D)
 . Ileana Ros-Lehtinen (R)
 . Robert Wexler (D)
 . Debbie Wasserman Schultz (D)
 . Lincoln Diaz-Balart (R)
 . Ron Klein (D)
 . Alcee Hastings (D)
 . Tom Feeney (R)
 . Mario Diaz-Balart (R)

Georgia
 . Jack Kingston (R)
 . Sanford Bishop (D)
 . Lynn Westmoreland (R)
 . Hank Johnson (D)
 . John Lewis (D)
 . Tom Price (R)
 . John Linder (R)
 . Jim Marshall (D)
 . Nathan Deal (R)
 . Charlie Norwood (R), until February 13, 2007
 Paul Broun (R), from July 17, 2007
 . Phil Gingrey (R)
 . John Barrow (D)
 . David Scott (D)

Hawaii
 . Neil Abercrombie (D)
 . Mazie Hirono (D)

Idaho
 . Bill Sali (R)
 . Mike Simpson (R)

Illinois
 . Bobby Rush (D)
 . Jesse Jackson Jr. (D)
 . Dan Lipinski (D)
 . Luis Gutiérrez (D)
 . Rahm Emanuel (D), until January 2, 2009, vacant thereafter
 . Peter Roskam (R)
 . Danny K. Davis (D)
 . Melissa Bean (D)
 . Jan Schakowsky (D)
 . Mark Kirk (R)
 . Jerry Weller (R)
 . Jerry Costello (D)
 . Judy Biggert (R)
 . Dennis Hastert (R), until November 26, 2007
 Bill Foster (D), from March 8, 2008
 . Timothy V. Johnson (R)
 . Don Manzullo (R)
 . Philip Hare (D)
 . Ray LaHood (R)
 . John Shimkus (R)

Indiana
 . Pete Visclosky (D)
 . Joe Donnelly (D)
 . Mark Souder (R)
 . Steve Buyer (R)
 . Dan Burton (R)
 . Mike Pence (R)
 . Julia Carson (D), until December 15, 2007
 André Carson (D), from March 11, 2008
 . Brad Ellsworth (D)
 . Baron Hill (D)

Iowa
 . Bruce Braley (D)
 . David Loebsack (D)
 . Leonard Boswell (D)
 . Tom Latham (R)
 . Steve King (R)

Kansas
 . Jerry Moran (R)
 . Nancy Boyda (D)
 . Dennis Moore (D)
 . Todd Tiahrt (R)

Kentucky
 . Ed Whitfield (R)
 . Ron Lewis (R)
 . John Yarmuth (D)
 . Geoff Davis (R)
 . Hal Rogers (R)
 . Ben Chandler (D)

Louisiana
 . Bobby Jindal (R), until January 14, 2008
 Steve Scalise (R), from May 3, 2008
 . William J. Jefferson (D)
 . Charlie Melançon (D)
 . Jim McCrery (R)
 . Rodney Alexander (R)
 . Richard Baker (R), until February 2, 2008
 Don Cazayoux (D), from May 3, 2008
 . Charles Boustany (R)

Maine
 . Tom Allen (D)
 . Mike Michaud (D)

Maryland
 . Wayne Gilchrest (R)
 . Dutch Ruppersberger (D)
 . John Sarbanes (D)
 . Albert Wynn (D), until May 31, 2008
 Donna Edwards (D), from June 17, 2008
 . Steny Hoyer (D)
 . Roscoe Bartlett (R)
 . Elijah Cummings (D)
 . Chris Van Hollen (D)

Massachusetts
 . John Olver (D)
 . Richard Neal (D)
 . Jim McGovern (D)
 . Barney Frank (D)
 . Marty Meehan (D), until July 1, 2007
 Niki Tsongas (D), from October 16, 2007
 . John F. Tierney (D)
 . Ed Markey (D)
 . Mike Capuano (D)
 . Stephen Lynch (D)
 . Bill Delahunt (D)

Michigan
 . Bart Stupak (D)
 . Peter Hoekstra (R)
 . Vern Ehlers (R)
 . Dave Camp (R)
 . Dale Kildee (D)
 . Fred Upton (R)
 . Tim Walberg (R)
 . Mike Rogers (R)
 . Joe Knollenberg (R)
 . Candice Miller (R)
 . Thaddeus McCotter (R)
 . Sander Levin (D)
 . Carolyn Cheeks Kilpatrick (D)
 . John Conyers (D)
 . John Dingell (D)

Minnesota
 . Tim Walz (DFL)
 . John Kline (R)
 . Jim Ramstad (R)
 . Betty McCollum (DFL)
 . Keith Ellison (DFL)
 . Michele Bachmann (R)
 . Collin Peterson (DFL)
 . Jim Oberstar (DFL)

Mississippi
 . Roger Wicker (R), until December 31, 2007
 Travis Childers (D), from May 13, 2008
 . Bennie Thompson (D)
 . Chip Pickering (R)
 . Gene Taylor (D)

Missouri
 . Lacy Clay (D)
 . Todd Akin (R)
 . Russ Carnahan (D)
 . Ike Skelton (D)
 . Emanuel Cleaver (D)
 . Sam Graves (R)
 . Roy Blunt (R)
 . Jo Ann Emerson (R)
 . Kenny Hulshof (R)

Montana
 . Denny Rehberg (R)

Nebraska
 . Jeff Fortenberry (R)
 . Lee Terry (R)
 . Adrian Smith (R)

Nevada
 . Shelley Berkley (D)
 . Dean Heller (R)
 . Jon Porter (R)

New Hampshire
 . Carol Shea-Porter (D)
 . Paul Hodes (D)

New Jersey
 . Rob Andrews (D)
 . Frank LoBiondo (R)
 . Jim Saxton (R)
 . Chris Smith (R)
 . Scott Garrett (R)
 . Frank Pallone (D)
 . Mike Ferguson (R)
 . Bill Pascrell (D)
 . Steve Rothman (D)
 . Donald M. Payne (D)
 . Rodney Frelinghuysen (R)
 . Rush Holt Jr. (D)
 . Albio Sires (D)

New Mexico
 . Heather Wilson (R)
 . Steve Pearce (R)
 . Tom Udall (D)

New York
 . Tim Bishop (D)
 . Steve Israel (D)
 . Peter T. King (R)
 . Carolyn McCarthy (D)
 . Gary Ackerman (D)
 . Gregory Meeks (D)
 . Joe Crowley (D)
 . Jerry Nadler (D)
 . Anthony Weiner (D)
 . Edolphus Towns (D)
 . Yvette Clarke (D)
 . Nydia Velázquez (D)
 . Vito Fossella (R)
 . Carolyn Maloney (D)
 . Charles Rangel (D)
 . José E. Serrano (D)
 . Eliot Engel (D)
 . Nita Lowey (D)
 . John Hall (D)
 . Kirsten Gillibrand (D)
 . Michael R. McNulty (D)
 . Maurice Hinchey (D)
 . John M. McHugh (R)
 . Michael Arcuri (D)
 . James T. Walsh (R)
 . Thomas M. Reynolds (R)
 . Brian Higgins (D)
 . Louise Slaughter (D)
 . Randy Kuhl (R)

North Carolina
 . G. K. Butterfield (D)
 . Bob Etheridge (D)
 . Walter B. Jones (R)
 . David Price (D)
 . Virginia Foxx (R)
 . Howard Coble (R)
 . Mike McIntyre (D)
 . Robin Hayes (R)
 . Sue Wilkins Myrick (R)
 . Patrick McHenry (R)
 . Heath Shuler (D)
 . Mel Watt (D)
 . Brad Miller (D)

North Dakota
 . Earl Pomeroy (D-NPL)

Ohio
 . Steve Chabot (R)
 . Jean Schmidt (R)
 . Mike Turner (R)
 . Jim Jordan (R)
 . Paul Gillmor (R), until September 5, 2007
 Bob Latta (R), from December 11, 2007
 . Charlie Wilson (D)
 . Dave Hobson (R)
 . John A. Boehner (R)
 . Marcy Kaptur (D)
 . Dennis Kucinich (D)
 . Stephanie Tubbs Jones (D), until August 20, 2008
 Marcia Fudge (D), from November 18, 2008
 . Pat Tiberi (R)
 . Betty Sutton (D)
 . Steve LaTourette (R)
 . Deborah Pryce (R)
 . Ralph Regula (R)
 . Tim Ryan (D)
 . Zack Space (D)

Oklahoma
 . John A. Sullivan (R)
 . Dan Boren (D)
 . Frank Lucas (R)
 . Tom Cole (R)
 . Mary Fallin (R)

Oregon
 . David Wu (D)
 . Greg Walden (R)
 . Earl Blumenauer (D)
 . Peter DeFazio (D)
 . Darlene Hooley (D)

Pennsylvania
 . Bob Brady (D)
 . Chaka Fattah (D)
 . Phil English (R)
 . Jason Altmire (D)
 . John E. Peterson (R)
 . Jim Gerlach (R)
 . Joe Sestak (D)
 . Patrick Murphy (D)
 . Bill Shuster (R)
 . Chris Carney (D)
 . Paul E. Kanjorski (D)
 . John Murtha (D)
 . Allyson Schwartz (D)
 . Michael F. Doyle (D)
 . Charlie Dent (R)
 . Joseph R. Pitts (R)
 . Tim Holden (D)
 . Tim Murphy (R)
 . Todd Platts (R)

Rhode Island
 . Patrick J. Kennedy (D)
 . James Langevin (D)

South Carolina
 . Henry E. Brown Jr. (R)
 . Joe Wilson (R)
 . Gresham Barrett (R)
 . Bob Inglis (R)
 . John Spratt (D)
 . Jim Clyburn (D)

South Dakota
 . Stephanie Herseth Sandlin (D)

Tennessee
 . David Davis (R)
 . Jimmy Duncan (R)
 . Zach Wamp (R)
 . Lincoln Davis (D)
 . Jim Cooper (D)
 . Bart Gordon (D)
 . Marsha Blackburn (R)
 . John S. Tanner (D)
 . Steve Cohen (D)

Texas
 . Louie Gohmert (R)
 . Ted Poe (R)
 . Sam Johnson (R)
 . Ralph Hall (R)
 . Jeb Hensarling (R)
 . Joe Barton (R)
 . John Culberson (R)
 . Kevin Brady (R)
 . Al Green (D)
 . Michael McCaul (R)
 . Mike Conaway (R)
 . Kay Granger (R)
 . Mac Thornberry (R)
 . Ron Paul (R)
 . Rubén Hinojosa (D)
 . Silvestre Reyes (D)
 . Chet Edwards (D)
 . Sheila Jackson-Lee (D)
 . Randy Neugebauer (R)
 . Charlie Gonzalez (D)
 . Lamar S. Smith (R)
 . Nick Lampson (D)
 . Ciro Rodriguez (D)
 . Kenny Marchant (R)
 . Lloyd Doggett (D)
 . Michael C. Burgess (R)
 . Solomon P. Ortiz (D)
 . Henry Cuellar (D)
 . Gene Green (D)
 . Eddie Bernice Johnson (D)
 . John Carter (R)
 . Pete Sessions (R)

Utah
 . Rob Bishop (R)
 . Jim Matheson (D)
 . Chris Cannon (R)

Vermont
 . Peter Welch (D)

Virginia
 . Jo Ann Davis (R), until October 6, 2007
 Rob Wittman (R), from December 11, 2007
 . Thelma Drake (R)
 . Robert C. Scott (D)
 . Randy Forbes (R)
 . Virgil Goode (R)
 . Bob Goodlatte (R)
 . Eric Cantor (R)
 . Jim Moran (D)
 . Rick Boucher (D)
 . Frank Wolf (R)
 . Tom Davis (R), until November 24, 2008, vacant thereafter

Washington
 . Jay Inslee (D)
 . Rick Larsen (D)
 . Brian Baird (D)
 . Doc Hastings (R)
 . Cathy McMorris Rodgers (R)
 . Norm Dicks (D)
 . Jim McDermott (D)
 . Dave Reichert (R)
 . Adam Smith (D)

West Virginia
 . Alan Mollohan (D)
 . Shelley Moore Capito (R)
 . Nick Rahall (D)

Wisconsin
 . Paul Ryan (R)
 . Tammy Baldwin (D)
 . Ron Kind (D)
 . Gwen Moore (D)
 . Jim Sensenbrenner (R)
 . Tom Petri (R)
 . Dave Obey (D)
 . Steve Kagen (D)

Wyoming
 . Barbara Cubin (R)

Non-voting members
 . Eni Faleomavaega (D)
 . Eleanor Holmes Norton (D)
 . Madeleine Bordallo (D)
 . Luis G. Fortuño (Resident Commissioner) (R/PNP), until January 2, 2009, vacant thereafter
 . Donna Christian-Christensen (D)

Changes in membership

Senate

There were two resignations and one death.

|-
| Wyoming (1)
|  | Craig Thomas (R)
| Died June 4, 2007. Successor appointed June 22, 2007, and then elected to finish the term.
|  | John Barrasso (R)
| June 22, 2007

|-
| Mississippi (1)
|  | Trent Lott (R)
| Resigned December 18, 2007. Successor appointed December 31, 2007, and then elected to finish the term.
|  | Roger Wicker (R)
| December 31, 2007

|-
| Illinois (3)
|  | Barack Obama (D)
| Resigned November 16, 2008, after being elected President of the United States, to focus on his presidential transition as President-elect of the United States.
| colspan=2 | Vacant until the next Congress.

|}

House of Representatives

|-
| Georgia 10th
|  | Charlie Norwood (R)
| Died February 13, 2007. A special election was held June 19, 2007.
|  | Paul Broun (R)
| July 17, 2007

|-
| California 37th
|  | Juanita Millender-McDonald (D)
| Died April 22, 2007. A special election was held August 21, 2007.
|  | Laura Richardson (D)
| August 21, 2007

|-
| Massachusetts 5th
|  | Marty Meehan (D)
| Resigned July 1, 2007, to become Chancellor of University of Massachusetts Lowell.A special election was held October 16, 2007.
|  | Niki Tsongas (D)
| October 16, 2007

|-
| Ohio 5th
|  | Paul Gillmor (R)
| Died September 5, 2007. A special election was held November 6, 2007.
|  | Bob Latta (R)
| December 11, 2007

|-
| Virginia 1st
|  | Jo Ann Davis (R)
| Died October 6, 2007. A special election was held December 11, 2007.
|  | Rob Wittman (R)
| December 11, 2007

|-
| Illinois 14th
|  | Dennis Hastert (R)
| Resigned November 26, 2007. A special election was held March 8, 2008.
|  | Bill Foster (D)
| March 8, 2008

|-
| Indiana 7th
|  | Julia Carson (D)
| Died December 15, 2007. A special election was held March 11, 2008.
|  | André Carson (D)
| March 11, 2008

|-
| Mississippi 1st
|  | Roger Wicker (R)
| Resigned December 31, 2007, when appointed U.S. Senator.A special election was held May 13, 2008.
|  | Travis Childers (D)
| May 13, 2008

|-
| Louisiana 1st
|  | Bobby Jindal (R)
| Resigned January 14, 2008, to become Governor of Louisiana.A special election was held May 3, 2008.
|  | Steve Scalise (R)
| May 3, 2008

|-
| Louisiana 6th
|  | Richard Baker (R)
| Resigned February 2, 2008, to become President of the Managed Funds Association.A special election was held May 3, 2008.
|  | Don Cazayoux (D)
| May 3, 2008

|-
| California 12th
|  | Tom Lantos (D)
| Died February 11, 2008. A special election was held April 8, 2008.
|  | Jackie Speier (D)
| April 8, 2008

|-
| Maryland 4th
|  | Albert Wynn (D)
| Resigned May 31, 2008, having lost re-nomination.A special election was held June 17, 2008.
|  | Donna Edwards (D)
| June 17, 2008

|-
| Ohio 11th
|  | Stephanie Tubbs Jones (D)
| Died August 20, 2008. A special election was held November 18, 2008.
|  | Marcia Fudge (D)
| November 18, 2008

|-
| Virginia 11th
|  | Thomas M. Davis (R)
| Resigned November 24, 2008, in advance of his retirement.Seat remained vacant for the remainder of this Congress.
| colspan=2 rowspan=3 | None.

|-
| Illinois 5th
|  | Rahm Emanuel (D)
| Resigned January 2, 2009, to become White House Chief of Staff.Seat remained vacant for the remainder of this Congress.

|-
| Puerto Rico At-large
|  | Luis Fortuño (R/PNP)
| Resigned January 2, 2009, to become Governor of Puerto Rico.Seat remained vacant for the remainder of this Congress.

|}

 Committees 

 Senate 

 Aging (Special) (Herb Kohl, Chair; Gordon H. Smith, Vice Chair)
 Agriculture (Tom Harkin, Chair; Saxby Chambliss, Ranking Member)
 Domestic and Foreign Marketing, Inspection, and Plant and Animal Health (Max Baucus, Chair; Lindsey Graham, Ranking Member)
 Energy, Science and Technology (Kent Conrad, Chair; John Thune, Ranking Member)
 Nutrition and Food Assistance, Sustainable and Organic Agriculture and General Legislation (Patrick Leahy, Chair; Norm Coleman, Ranking Member)
 Production, Income Protection and Price Support (Blanche L. Lincoln, Chair; Pat Roberts, Ranking Member)
 Rural Revitalization, Conservation, Forestry and Credit (Debbie Stabenow, Chair; Mike Crapo, Ranking Member)
 Appropriations (Robert C. Byrd, Chair; Thad Cochran, Ranking Member)
 Agriculture, Rural Development, Food and Drug Administration, and Related Agencies (Herb Kohl, Chair; Robert F. Bennett, Ranking Member)
 Commerce, Justice, Science, and Related Agencies (Barbara A. Mikulski, Chair; Richard C. Shelby, Ranking Member)
 Defense (Daniel Inouye, Chair; Ted Stevens, Ranking Member)
 Energy and Water Development (Byron L. Dorgan, Chair; Pete Domenici, Ranking Member)
 Financial Services and General Government (Dick Durbin, Chair; Sam Brownback, Ranking Member)
 Homeland Security (Robert C. Byrd, Chair; Thad Cochran, Ranking Member)
 Interior, Environment, and Related Agencies (Dianne Feinstein, Chair; Larry E. Craig, Ranking Member)
 Labor, Health and Human Services, Education, and Related Agencies (Tom Harkin, Chair; Arlen Specter, Ranking Member)
 Legislative Branch (Mary Landrieu, Chair; Wayne Allard, Ranking Member)
 Military Construction, Veterans Affairs, and Related Agencies (Tim Johnson, Chair; Kay Hutchison, Ranking Member)
 State, Foreign Operations, and Related Programs (Patrick Leahy, Chair; Judd Gregg, Ranking Member)
 Transportation, Housing and Urban Development, and Related Agencies (Patty Murray, Chair; Kit Bond, Ranking Member)
 Armed Services (Carl Levin, Chair; John McCain, Ranking Member)
 Airland (Joe Lieberman, Chair; John Cornyn, Ranking Member)
 Emerging Threats and Capabilities (Jack Reed, Chair; Elizabeth Dole, Ranking Member)
 Personnel (Ben Nelson, Chair; Lindsey Graham, Ranking Member)
 Readiness and Management Support (Daniel Akaka, Chair; John Ensign, Ranking Member)
 SeaPower (Edward Kennedy, Chair; John Thune, Ranking Member)
 Strategic Forces (Bill Nelson, Chair; Jeff Sessions, Ranking Member)
 Banking, Housing, and Urban Affairs (Chris Dodd, Chair; Richard C. Shelby, Ranking Member)
 Economic Policy (Tom Carper, Chair; Jim Bunning, Ranking Member)
 Financial Institutions (Tim Johnson, Chair; Chuck Hagel, Ranking Member)
 Housing, Transportation, and Community Development (Chuck Schumer, Chair; Mike Crapo, Ranking Member)
 Securities, Insurance, and Investment (Jack Reed, Chair; Wayne Allard, Ranking Member)
 Security and International Trade and Finance (Evan Bayh, Chair; Mel Martinez, Ranking Member)
 Budget (Kent Conrad, Chair; Judd Gregg, Ranking Member)
 Commerce, Science and Transportation (Daniel Inouye, Chair; Ted Stevens, Vice Chair)
 Aviation Operations, Safety, and Security (John D. Rockefeller IV, Chair; Trent Lott, Ranking Member)
 Consumer Affairs, Insurance, and Automotive Safety (Mark Pryor, Chair; John Sununu, Ranking Member)
 Interstate Commerce, Trade, and Tourism (Byron Dorgan, Chair; Jim DeMint, Ranking Member)
 Oceans, Atmosphere, Fisheries, and Coast Guard (Maria Cantwell, Chair; Olympia Snowe, Ranking Member)
 Science, Technology and Innovation (John Kerry, Chair; John Ensign, Ranking Member)
 Space, Aeronautics, and Related Sciences (Bill Nelson, Chair; Kay Bailey Hutchison, Ranking Member)
 Surface Transportation and Merchant Marine Infrastructure, Safety, and Security (Frank Lautenberg, Chair; Gordon H. Smith, Ranking Member)
 Energy and Natural Resources (Jeff Bingaman, Chair; Pete Domenici, Ranking Member)
 Energy (Byron Dorgan, Chair; Lisa Murkowski, Ranking Member)
 National Parks (Daniel Akaka, Chair; Lisa Murkowski, Ranking Member)
 Public Lands and Forests (Ron Wyden, Chair; Richard Burr, Ranking Member)
 Water and Power (Tim Johnson, Chair; Bob Corker, Ranking Member)
 Environment and Public Works (Barbara Boxer, Chair; James M. Inhofe, Ranking Member)
 Clean Air and Nuclear Safety (Tom Carper, Chair; George Voinovich, Ranking Member)
 Public Sector Solutions to Global Warning, Oversight and Children's Health Protection (Joe Lieberman, Chair; John Warner, Ranking Member)
 Private Sector and Consumer Solutions to Global Warming and Wildlife Protection (Barbara Boxer, Chair; Lamar Alexander, Ranking Member)
 Superfund and Environmental Health (Hillary Clinton, Chair; Larry E. Craig, Ranking Member)
 Transportation and Infrastructure (Max Baucus, Chair; Johnny Isakson, Ranking Member)
 Transportation Safety, Infrastructure Security and Water Quality (Frank Lautenberg, Chair; David Vitter, Ranking Member)
 Select Committee on Ethics (Barbara Boxer, Chair; John Cornyn, Ranking Member) 
 Finance (Max Baucus, Chair; Chuck Grassley, Ranking Member)
 Energy, Natural Resources, and Infrastructure (Jeff Bingaman, Chair; Gordon H. Smith, Ranking Member)
 Health Care (John D. Rockefeller IV, Chair; Orrin Hatch, Ranking Member)
 International Trade and Global Competitiveness (Blanche Lincoln, Chair; Gordon H. Smith, Ranking Member)
 Social Security, Pensions, and Family Policy (John Kerry, Chair; Jim Bunning, Ranking Member)
 Taxation, IRS Oversight, and Long-Term Growth (Kent Conrad, Chair; Jon Kyl, Ranking Member)
 Foreign Relations (Joe Biden, Chair; Richard Lugar, Ranking Member)
 African Affairs (Russ Feingold, Chair; John E. Sununu, Ranking Member)
 East Asian and Pacific Affairs (Barbara Boxer, Chair; Lisa Murkowski, Ranking Member)
 European Affairs (Barack Obama, Chair; Jim DeMint, Ranking Member)
 International Development and Foreign Assistance, Economic Affairs, and International Environmental Protection (Bob Menendez, Chair; Chuck Hagel, Ranking Member)
 International Operations and Organizations, Democracy and Human Rights (Bill Nelson, Chair; David Vitter, Ranking Member)
 Near Eastern and South and Central Asian Affairs (John Kerry, Chair; Norm Coleman, Ranking Member)
 Western Hemisphere, Peace Corps and Narcotics Affairs (Chris Dodd, Chair; Bob Corker, Ranking Member) 
 Health, Education, Labor, and Pensions (Edward Kennedy, Chair; Mike Enzi, Ranking Member)
 Children and Families (Chris Dodd, Chair; Lamar Alexander, Ranking Member)
 Employment and Workplace Safety (Patty Murray, Chair; Johnny Isakson, Ranking Member)
 Retirement and Aging (Barbara Mikulski, Chair; Richard Burr, Ranking Member)
 Homeland Security and Governmental Affairs (Joe Lieberman, Chair; Susan Collins, Ranking Member)
 Contracting Oversight (Ad Hoc)
(Disaster Recovery (Ad Hoc)
 Federal Financial Management, Government Information and International Security (Tom Carper, Chair; Tom Coburn, Ranking Member)
 Oversight of Government Management, the Federal Workforce and the District of Columbia (Daniel Akaka, Chair; George Voinovich, Ranking Member)
 Investigations (Permanent) (Carl Levin, Chair; Norm Coleman, Ranking Member)
 Disaster Recovery (Ad Hoc) (Mary Landrieu, Chair; Ted Stevens, Ranking Member)
 State, Local, and Private Sector Preparedness and Integration (Ad Hoc) (Mark Pryor, Chair; John E. Sununu, Ranking Member)
 Indian Affairs (Byron Dorgan, Chair; Lisa Murkowski, Vice Chair)
 Intelligence (Select) (Jay Rockefeller, Chair)
 International Narcotics Control (Joe Biden, Chair)
 Judiciary (Patrick Leahy, Chair; Arlen Specter, Ranking Member) 
 Administrative Oversight and the Courts (Chuck Schumer, Chair; Jeff Sessions, Ranking Member) 
 Antitrust, Competition Policy and Consumer Rights (Herb Kohl, Chair; Orrin Hatch, Ranking Member) 
 The Constitution (Russ Feingold, Chair; Sam Brownback, Ranking Member) 
 Crime and Drugs (Joe Biden, Chair; Lindsey Graham, Ranking Member) 
 Human Rights and the Law (Edward Kennedy, Chair; Tom Coburn, Ranking Member) 
 Immigration, Refugees, and Border Security (Edward Kennedy, Chair; John Cornyn, Ranking Member) 
 Terrorism, Technology and Homeland Security (Dianne Feinstein, Chair; Jon Kyl, Ranking Member) 
 Rules and Administration (Dianne Feinstein, Chair; Robert F. Bennett, Ranking Member) 
 Small Business and Entrepreneurship (John Kerry, Chair; Olympia Snowe, Ranking Member) 
 Veterans' Affairs (Daniel Akaka, Chair; Larry E. Craig, Ranking Member)

 House of Representatives 

 Agriculture (Collin Peterson, Chair; Bob Goodlatte, Ranking Member)
 Conservation, Credit, Energy, and Research (Tim Holden, Chair; Frank D. Lucas, Ranking Member)
 Department Operations, Oversight, Nutrition and Forestry (Joe Baca, Chair; Jo Bonner, Ranking Member)
 General Farm Commodities and Risk Management (Bob Etheridge, Chair; Jerry Moran, Ranking Member)
 Horticulture and Organic Agriculture (Dennis Cardoza, Chair; Randy Neugebauer, Ranking Member)
 Livestock, Dairy, and Poultry (Leonard Boswell, Chair; Robin Hayes, Ranking Member)
 Specialty Crops, Rural Development and Foreign Agriculture (Mike McIntyre, Chair; Marilyn Musgrave, Ranking Member)
 Appropriations (David R. Obey, Chair; Jerry Lewis, Ranking Member)
 Agriculture, Rural Development, Food and Drug Administration, and Related Agencies (Rosa DeLauro, Chair; Jack Kingston, Ranking Member)
 Commerce, Justice, Science, and Related Agencies (Alan Mollohan, Chair; Rodney P. Frelinghuysen, Ranking Member)
 Defense (John P. Murtha, Chair; C.W. Bill Young, Ranking Member)
 Energy and Water Development (Chet Edwards, Chair; David Hobson, Ranking Member)
 Financial Services and General Government (Jose E. Serrano, Chair; Ralph Regula, Ranking Member)
 Homeland Security (David Price, Chair; Hal Rogers, Ranking Member)
 Interior, Environment, and Related Agencies (Norman Dicks, Chair; Todd Tiahrt, Ranking Member)
 Labor, Health and Human Services, Education, and Related Agencies (David R. Obey, Chair; James T. Walsh, Ranking Member)
 Legislative Branch (Debbie Wasserman Schultz, Chair; Zach Wamp, Ranking Member)
 Military Construction, Veterans Affairs, and Related Agencies (Chet Edwards, Chair; Roger F. Wicker, Ranking Member)
 State, Foreign Operations, and Related Programs (Nita Lowey, Chair; Frank Wolf, Ranking Member)
 Transportation, Housing and Urban Development, and Related Agencies (John W. Olver, Chair; Joe Knollenberg, Ranking Member)
 Armed Services (Ike Skelton, Chair; Duncan L. Hunter, Ranking Member)
 Readiness (Solomon P. Ortiz, Chair; Jo Ann Davis, Ranking Member)
 Seapower and Expeditionary Forces (Gene Taylor, Chair; Roscoe G. Bartlett, Ranking Member)
 Air and Land Forces (Neil Abercrombie, Chair; Jim Saxton, Ranking Member)
 Oversight and Investigations (Vic Snyder, Chair; John M. McHugh, Ranking Member)
 Military Personnel (Vic Snyder, Chair; W. Todd Akin, Ranking Member)
 Terrorism, Unconventional Threats and Capabilities (Adam Smith, Chair; Mac Thornberry, Ranking Member)
 Strategic Forces (Ellen O. Tauscher, Chair; Terry Everett, Ranking Member)
 Budget (John Spratt, Chair; Paul Ryan, Ranking Member)
 Education and Labor (George Miller, Chair; Buck McKeon, Ranking Member)
 Early Childhood, Elementary and Secondary Education (Dale Kildee, Chair; Michael Castle, Ranking Member)
 Healthy Families and Communities (Carolyn McCarthy, Chair; Todd Russell Platts, Ranking Member)
 Health, Employment, Labor, and Pensions (Robert E. Andrews, Chair; John Kline, Ranking Member)
 Higher Education, Lifelong Learning, and Competitiveness (Ruben Hinojosa, Chair; Ric Keller, Ranking Member)
 Workforce Protections (Lynn C. Woolsey, Chair; Joe Wilson, Ranking Member)
 Energy and Commerce (John D. Dingell, Chair; Joe Barton, Ranking Member)
 Health (Frank Pallone, Chair; Nathan Deal, Ranking Member)
 Energy and Air Quality (Rick Boucher, Chair; Dennis Hastert, Ranking Member)
 Commerce, Trade and Consumer Protection (Bobby Rush, Chair; Cliff Stearns, Ranking Member)
 Telecommunications and the Internet (Edward Markey, Chair; Fred Upton, Ranking Member)
 Oversight and Investigations (Bart Stupak, Chair; Ed Whitfield, Ranking Member)
 Energy Independence and Global Warming (Select) (Edward Markey, Chair; Jim Sensenbrenner, Ranking Member)
 Financial Services (Barney Frank, Chair; Spencer Bachus, Ranking Member)
 Domestic and International Monetary Policy, Trade and Technology (Luis V. Gutierrez, Chair; Ron Paul, Ranking Member)
 Oversight and Investigations (Melvin L. Watt, Chair; Gary G. Miller, Ranking Member)
 Housing and Community Opportunity (Maxine Waters, Chair; Judy Biggert, Ranking Member)
 Financial Institutions and Consumer Credit (Carolyn B. Maloney, Chair; Paul E. Gillmor, Ranking Member)
 Capital Markets, Insurance, and Government-Sponsored Enterprises (Paul E. Kanjorski, Chair; Deborah Pryce, Ranking Member)
 Foreign Affairs (Tom Lantos, Chair until February 11, then Howard Berman; Ileana Ros-Lehtinen, Ranking Member)
 Africa and Global Health (Donald M. Payne, Chair; Chris Smith, Ranking Member)
 Asia, the Pacific, and the Global Environment (Eni Faleomavaega, Chair; Donald Manzullo, Ranking Member)
 Europe (Robert Wexler, Chair; Elton Gallegly, Ranking Member)
 International Organizations, Human Rights, and Oversight (William Delahunt, Chair; Dana Rohrabacher, Ranking Member)
 Middle East and South Asia (Gary Ackerman, Chair; Mike Pence, Ranking Member)
 Terrorism, Nonproliferation, and Trade (Brad Sherman, Chair; Edward Royce, Ranking Member)
 Western Hemisphere (Eliot Engel, Chair; Dan Burton, Ranking Member)
 Homeland Security (Bennie G. Thompson, Chair; Peter King, Ranking Member)
 Border, Maritime and Global Counterterrorism (Loretta Sanchez, Chair; Mark Souder, Ranking Member)
 Emergency Communications, Preparedness, and Response (Henry Cuellar, Chair; Charles Dent, Ranking Member)
 Emerging Threats, Cybersecurity, and Science and Technology (James R. Langevin, Chair; Michael McCaul, Ranking Member)
 Intelligence, Information Sharing, and Terrorism Risk Assessment (Jane Harman, Chair; David Reichert, Ranking Member)
 Management, Investigations, and Oversight (Christopher P. Carney, Chair; Mike D. Rogers, Ranking Member)
 Transportation Security and Infrastructure Protection (Sheila Jackson-Lee, Chair; Daniel Lungren, Ranking Member)
 House Administration (Bob Brady, Chair; Vern Ehlers, Ranking Member)
 Capitol Security (Bob Brady, Chair; Daniel Lungren, Ranking Member)
 Elections (Zoe Lofgren, Chair; Kevin McCarthy, Ranking Member)
 Intelligence (Permanent Select) (Silvestre Reyes, Chair; Pete Hoekstra, Ranking Member)
 Judiciary (John Conyers, Chair; Lamar Smith, Ranking Member)
 Commercial and Administrative Law (Linda Sanchez, Chair; Chris Cannon, Ranking Member)
 Constitution, Civil Rights, and Civil Liberties (Jerrold Nadler, Chair; Trent Franks, Ranking Member)
 Courts, the Internet, and Intellectual Property (Howard Berman, Chair; Howard Coble, Ranking Member)
 Crime, Terrorism, and Homeland Security (Bobby Scott, Chair; J. Randy Forbes, Ranking Member)
 Immigration, Citizenship, Refugees, Border Security, and International Law (Zoe Lofgren, Chair; Steve King, Ranking Member)
 Natural Resources (Nick Rahall, Chair; Don Young, Ranking Member)
 Energy and Mineral Resources (Jim Costa, Chair; Steve Pearce, Ranking Member)
 Fisheries, Wildlife and Oceans (Madeleine Bordallo, Chair; Henry E. Brown Jr., Ranking Member)
 Insular Affairs (Donna Christensen, Chair; Luis Fortuno, Ranking Member)
 National Parks, Forests and Public Lands (Raul Grijalva, Chair; Rob Bishop, Ranking Member)
 Water and Power (Grace F. Napolitano, Chair; Cathy McMorris Rodgers, Ranking Member)
 Oversight and Government Reform (Henry A. Waxman, Chair; Thomas M. Davis, Ranking Member)
 Domestic Policy (Dennis Kucinich, Chair; Darrell Issa, Ranking Member)
 Federal Workforce, Post Office, and District of Columbia (Danny K. Davis, Chair; Kenny Marchant, Ranking Member)
 Government Management, Organization, and Procurement (Edolphus Towns, Chair; Brian Bilbray, Ranking Member)
 Information Policy, Census, and National Archives (Lacy Clay, Chair; Mike Turner, Ranking Member)
 National Security and Foreign Affairs (John F. Tierney, Chair; Christopher Shays, Ranking Member)
 Rules (Louise Slaughter, Chair; David Dreier, Ranking Member)
 Legislative and Budget Process (Alcee Hastings, Chair; Lincoln Diaz-Balart, Ranking Member)
 Rules and the Organization of the House (Jim McGovern, Chair; Doc Hastings, Ranking Member)
 Science and Technology (Bart Gordon, Chair; Ralph M. Hall, Ranking Member)
 Space and Aeronautics (Mark Udall, Chair; Ken Calvert Ranking Member)
 Technology and Innovation (David Wu, Chair; Phil Gingrey, Ranking Member)
 Research and Science Education (Brian Baird, Chair; Vernon Ehlers, Ranking Member)
 Investigations and Oversight (Brad Miller, Chair; Jim Sensenbrenner, Ranking Member)
 Energy and Environment (Nick Lampson, Chair; Bob Inglis, Ranking Member)
 Small Business (Nydia Velazquez, Chair; Steve Chabot, Ranking Member)
 Finance and Tax (Melissa Bean, Chair; Dean Heller, Ranking Member)
 Contracting and Technology (Bruce L. Braley, Chair; Roscoe G. Bartlett, Ranking Member)
 Rural and Urban Entrepreneurship (Heath Shuler, Chair; Jeff Fortenberry, Ranking Member)
 Regulations, Healthcare and Trade (Charles A. Gonzalez, Chair; Lynn Westmoreland, Ranking Member)
 Investigations and Oversight (Jason Altmire, Chair; Louie Gohmert, Ranking Member)
 Standards of Official Conduct (Stephanie Tubbs Jones, Chair; Doc Hastings, Ranking Member)
 Transportation and Infrastructure (James L. Oberstar, Chair; John L. Mica, Ranking Member)
 Aviation (Jerry F. Costello, Chair; Thomas E. Petri, Ranking Member)
 Coast Guard and Maritime Transportation (Elijah E. Cummings, Chair; Steven C. LaTourette, Ranking Member)
 Economic Development, Public Buildings and Emergency Management (Eleanor Holmes Norton, Chair; Sam Graves, Ranking Member)
 Highways and Transit (Peter DeFazio, Chair; Jimmy Duncan, Ranking Member)
 Railroads, Pipelines, and Hazardous Materials (Corrine Brown, Chair; Bill Shuster, Ranking Member)
 Water Resources and Environment (Eddie Bernice Johnson, Chair; Richard Baker, Ranking Member)
 Veterans' Affairs (Bob Filner, Chair; Steve Buyer, Ranking Member)
 Disability Assistance and Memorial Affairs (John Hall, Chair; Doug Lamborn, Ranking Member)
 Economic Opportunity (Stephanie Herseth Sandlin, Chair; John Boozman, Ranking Member)
 Health (Michael Michaud, Chair; Jeff Miller, Ranking Member)
 Oversight and Investigations (Harry E. Mitchell, Chair; Ginny Brown-Waite, Ranking Member)
 Ways and Means (Charles B. Rangel, Chair; Jim McCrery, Ranking Member)
 Health (Pete Stark, Chair; Dave Camp, Ranking Member)
 Social Security (Michael McNulty, Chair; Sam Johnson, Ranking Member)
 Income Security and Family Support (Jim McDermott, Chair; Jerry Weller, Ranking Member)
 Trade (Sander M. Levin, Chair; Wally Herger, Ranking Member)
 Oversight (John Lewis, Chair; Jim Ramstad, Ranking Member)
 Select Revenue Measures (Richard E. Neal, Chair; Phil English, Ranking Member)
 Whole

 Joint committees
 Economic (Sen. Chuck Schumer, Chair; Rep. Carolyn B. Maloney, Vice Chair) 
 The Library (Rep. Dianne Feinstein, Chair; Rep. Bob Brady, Vice Chair)
 Printing (Rep. Bob Brady, Chair; Sen. Dianne Feinstein, Vice Chair)
 Joint Committee on Taxation (Rep. Charles Rangel, Chair; Sen. Max Baucus, Vice Chair)

Caucuses

Employees
Other officers and officials include:

Legislative branch agency directors

 Architect of the Capitol:Alan M. Hantman, until February 2, 2007
 Stephen T. Ayers (acting), thereafter
 Attending Physician of the United States Congress: John F. Eisold
 Comptroller General of the United States: David M. Walker, until 2008
 Eugene Louis Dodaro (acting), from March 13, 2008
 Director of the Congressional Budget Office: Donald B. Marron Jr., until January 18, 2007
 Peter R. Orszag, January 25, 2007 – November 25, 2008
 Robert A. Sunshine (acting), starting November 25, 2008
 Librarian of Congress: James H. Billington
 Public Printer of the United States: Robert C. Tapella

Senate
 Chaplain: Barry C. Black (Seventh-day Adventist)
 Curator: Diane K. Skvarla
 Historian: Richard A. Baker
 Parliamentarian: Alan Frumin
 Secretary: Nancy Erickson
 Librarian: Greg Harness, until 2008
 Mary E. Cornaby, starting 2008
 Sergeant at Arms: Terrance W. Gainer
 Secretary for the Majority: Martin P. Paone, until January 23, 2008
 Lula J. Davis, elected January 23, 2008
 Secretary for the Minority: David J. Schiappa

House of Representatives
 Chaplain: Daniel P. Coughlin (Roman Catholic)
 Chief Administrative Officer: James M. Eagen III (through February 15, 2007)
 Daniel P. Beard (February 15, 2007 – end)
 Clerk: Karen L. Haas, until February 15, 2007
 Lorraine Miller, elected February 15, 2007
 Historian: Robert V. Remini
 Parliamentarian: John V. Sullivan
 Reading Clerks: Mary Kevin Niland, Susan Cole, Paul Hays (until April 30, 2007)
 Sergeant at Arms: Wilson Livingood
 Inspector General: James J. Cornell

See also

Elections
 2006 United States elections (elections leading to this Congress)
 2006 United States Senate elections
 2006 United States House of Representatives elections
 2008 United States elections (elections during this Congress, leading to the next Congress)
 2008 United States presidential election
 2008 United States Senate elections
 2008 United States House of Representatives elections

Membership lists
 Members of the 110th United States Congress
 List of new members of the 110th United States Congress

 Notes 

References

External links
 Biographical Directory of the United States Congress
 House History from the U.S. House of Representatives
 Statistics & Lists from the U.S. Senate
 Congressional Directory: Main Page, Government Printing Office Online. Detailed listings of many aspects of previous memberships and sessions of Congress.
 Legislative information from Congress.gov'' at the Library of Congress